Herky the Hawk is the athletics mascot of the University of Iowa Hawkeyes. Herky is a student dressed in black and gold, including wings made out of fabric, with a headpiece shaped like a hawk's head. Herky was first drawn as a cartoon in 1948, and was first portrayed at a football game in 1959. Periodically, Herky's wardrobe and overall design have been updated. There are currently two different styles of Herky costumes. The version used at football games and related events features Herky wearing a Hawkeye football helmet. The version used at basketball games and other events features Herky with different facial features and no helmet.

Other important figures to the University of Iowa are the tiger hawk symbol, a logo designed during Hayden Fry's tenure as coach of the Iowa football team, and the Golden Girl and Drum Major, which perform with the University of Iowa marching band and during football games.

History

Hawkeyes
The state of Iowa acquired the nickname chiefly through the efforts of newspaper editor James G. Edwards of Fort Madison and Judge David Rorer of Burlington. The city of Burlington had been established in 1833 after the Black Hawk War of 1832. Edwards proposed the nickname "Hawk-eyes" in 1838 to "...rescue from oblivion a memento, at least of the name of the old chief" Black Hawk. In 1843 Edwards moved his newspaper, the Fort Madison Patriot, to Burlington and renamed it the Burlington Hawkeye in tribute to his friend Black Hawk (who was not a chief).

The name "Hawkeye" was already in the public conscience through James Fenimore Cooper's bestselling The Last of the Mohicans of the 1820s and 1830s where Hawkeye was the Indian name of the series' protagonist, Natty Bumppo. It is thought by some that this popularity helped Rorer and Edwards' campaign to make Hawkeyes a nickname for Iowans. The University borrowed its athletic nickname from the state of Iowa, also known as the Hawkeye State.

Birth of Herky

In 1948, journalism instructor Richard Spencer III, better known as Dick Spencer, drew a caricature of a hawk for Frank Havlicek, business director for the university's athletic department, who was looking for a symbol to represent the athletic teams. The university liked the drawing and adapted it, but left the naming of the bird to the fans through a statewide contest. John Franklin, a Belle Plaine, Iowa alumnus, suggested the name Herky as a reference to Hercules. Spencer continued to draw Herky playing a variety of sports and doing other activities inside and outside of the university. During the Korean War, Herky donned a military uniform and became the mascot of the 124th Fighter Squadron.

Herky takes the field
Herky first appeared as a costumed mascot during a football game in 1959.  Herky's appearances at games were tumultuous, including pranks pulled on other mascots and hazardous stunts, leading to university officials to decide to put an end to the costumed version of Herky.  However, Larry Herb, a transfer student, had a desire to portray Herky, and convinced administrators to give him a chance.  It was Herb's enthusiasm that also led to a fiberglass headpiece being manufactured and other changes being made to the costume.  When Herb, a member of Delta Tau Delta, left the university, he handed the duties of being Herky off to one of his fraternity brothers. This led to a longstanding tradition of only Delts being inside Herky's costume. However, in 1999 the Delts lost their charter, and since that time the university has held open tryouts for prospective Herkys. It was at these tryouts where Angie Anderson and Carrie MacDonald were the first female students chosen to be the mascot.

Herky today
The most common depiction of Herky today is a result of the athletic department's decision in the early 1980s to use Herky as a marketing tool.  A universal version of Herky that could be used for all sports was needed.  Native Iowa City artist Charles Reed based his drawing of Herky on two sources: former Hawkeye wrestler Barry Davis and cartoon character Mighty Mouse. Herky is also involved in occasional gimmicks, such as the Alumni Herky with a white beard who appears alongside the normal Herky at the annual homecoming game, and in 2010, a special Captain America-themed Herky was introduced during Iowa's football game with Michigan State.

As part of the 75th anniversary of Kinnick Stadium, the University of Iowa athletic department and Iowa City/Coralville Convention & Visitors Bureau partnered with the cities of Iowa City, Coralville and University Heights to organize "Herky on Parade."  90 different statues of Herky, each decorated with a different theme, were placed on campus and in the surrounding communities.

On November 22, 1997, during a below freezing Iowa 31-0 football victory over Minnesota at Kinnick Stadium, a Golden Gopher drummer had a cup of water thrown on his face by Herky after the drummer used his drumstick to tap Herky on his shoulder pad.  As Herky skipped away he was tackled from behind by the drummer. Rather than take a hand offered to help the mascot to his feet, Herky broke the drummer's glasses with a punch to the face. The end result of Herky's assault on the drummer was the breaking of the historic 40-year-old cheer-bird's head. Members of the Minnesota band took small trophy pieces of the broken helmet back to Minnesota. The helmet was re-made of Kevlar for the 1998 season.

Herky has become a regular representative of Iowa athletics in national mascot competitions. Herky began participating in the Universal Cheerleading Association's mascot competition in 2004. In 2006 Herky made his first appearance in the national finals in Orlando, FL and placed 8th out of 10,. Herky qualified for the finals a second time in 2008.

References

External links
 "The Hawkeyes and Herky"
 "Gopher Band Hits Sour Note in Herky Number"

Big Ten Conference mascots
Iowa Hawkeyes